Carabus odoratus is a species of ground beetle in the Carabinae subfamily that can be found in Russia and the eastern Palearctic realm.

References

odoratus
Beetles described in 1844